Ligabuesaurus is a genus of somphospondylan sauropod dinosaur from the Early Cretaceous that lived in what is now Argentina. The type species, Ligabuesaurus leanzai, was described by Jose Bonaparte, Gonzalez Riga, and Sebastián Apesteguía in 2006, based on a partial skeleton with skull, holotype MCF-PHV-233. The generic name, Ligabuesaurus, honors Giancarlo Ligabue, while the specific name, leanzai, honors the geologist Dr. Héctor A. Leanza, who discovered the skeleton in the Lohan Cura Formation. In 2022, a second skeleton was referred, specimen MCF-PHV-228. A third skeleton was recovered but not referred due to a lack of overlapping material. The three skeletons were excavated between 1998 and 2000.

References 

Macronarians
Early Cretaceous dinosaurs of South America
Albian life
Aptian life
Cretaceous Argentina
Fossils of Argentina
Fossil taxa described in 2006
Taxa named by José Bonaparte